Face Down, Ass Up is a comedy album by American comedian Andrew Dice Clay, released in 2000.

Track listing
 Banana Girl – 0:33
 Dice Funk-Up – 1:29
 He Said, She Said – 7:42
 Sid and the Oriental – 3:17
 K2Y: China Diner – 2:37
 The Poem – 0:24
 Big Head – 0:55
 Midgets 2000 – 5:19
 Banana Nose – 0:33
 Big Tit/Pin Tit – 3:59
 K2Y: Wife – 0:47
 Sid/All Bound Up – 0:16
 Never Marry Her – 1:21
 For Who, For Her, For What – 0:35
 The Honeymoon – 1:53
 The Honeymoon's Over – 0:55
 Road Call – 1:22
 Date Night at the Movies – 3:47
 Home or Office, You Decide – 0:44
 The Pencil Room – 1:19
 Old School Phone – 6:59
 My Cum – 1:29
 Grocery - Part 1 – 0:31
 Fish Tank – 0:28
 Grocery - Part 2 – 1:22
 Rita's Ass Funnel – 1:41
 Flat Ass/Fat Ass – 1:10
 My Statement – 1:02
 Fat Ass House Mix – 2:26
 Sid/In the Toilet – 2:31
 Club 33 (featuring Snoop Dogg) – 3:10
 Good 4 U 5:04
 Club 33 (featuring Snoop Dogg) (Reprise) – 3:17

References

External links
[ Allmusic]

Andrew Dice Clay albums
2000 live albums
2000s comedy albums
Live comedy albums
Spoken word albums by American artists